Dave Kwakman (born 7 August 2004) is a Dutch footballer who plays for Jong AZ as a midfielder.

Personal life
Kwakman comes from Volendam and lived a few houses away from fellow professional Joey Veerman growing up. Kwakman started playing under-12 football for RKAV Volendam.

Career
Kwakman signed his first contract with AZ Alkmaar in March 2021 keeping him to the club until the summer of 2024. He was part of the AZ under-18 side that won a league and cup double in the 2021-22 season. 

Kwakman made his professional debut for Jong AZ on the 5 September, 2022 against FC Dordrecht at home in the Eerste Divisie in a 3-1 victory.

International career
In March 2020 he was called up to the Dutch under-16 squad. In September 2022 Kwakman was representing the Dutch U19 team.

References

External links
 

Living people
2004 births
Dutch footballers
Eerste Divisie players